Johann Gottfried Piefke (9 September 1817 – 25 January 1884) was a German band leader, (Kapellmeister) and composer of military music.

Piefke was born in Schwerin an der Warthe, Prussia (now Skwierzyna, Poland). In the 1850s, he was band leader for the 8th Infantry Regiment in Berlin. His famous marches include Preußens Gloria, Düppeler Schanzen-Marsch and the Königgrätzer Marsch – the latter composed after the Battle of Königgrätz in 1866, the decisive battle of the Austro-Prussian War). He arranged Franz Liszt's symphonic poem – Tasso for military band and may also have similarly arranged some of Liszt's marches.  He died in Frankfurt an der Oder.

Piefke also wrote:
 Pochhammer Marsch
 Siegesmarsch
 Gitana Marsch
 Margarethen Marsch
 Kaiser-Wilhelm-Siegesmarsch
 Der Alsenströmer, a march commemorating the Battle of Als during the Second Schleswig War.
 Der Lymfjordströmer, another march commemorating the Danish War.

Honors
Piefke received the following medals:
Düppeler-Sturmkreuz, 1864
Golden Medal of the Emperor of Austria-Hungary, 1865
Royal Order of the House of Hohenzollern, 1869
Iron Cross Second Class, 1870
Prussian Crown Order, 1880

In popular culture 
 "Piefke" persists as a derogatory nickname for Germans in Austria.
 Piefke's Königgrätzer Marsch can be heard playing during the book burning scene in the film Indiana Jones and the Last Crusade. It was one of Adolf Hitler's favorite marches and was often played during his public appearances.

References

Naxos Records: Johann Gottfried Piefke

1817 births
1884 deaths
19th-century classical composers
19th-century German composers
19th-century conductors (music)
German Romantic composers
German male classical composers
German conductors (music)
German male conductors (music)
German military musicians
Military music composers
People from Skwierzyna
People from the Grand Duchy of Posen